Carling Avenue is a major east–west arterial road in the west end of Ottawa, Ontario, Canada. It runs from March Road in Kanata to Bronson Avenue in the Glebe. The road is named for John Carling, founder of Carling Brewery and Conservative MP and Senator, Postmaster General and Minister of Agriculture.

Road description

It used to begin at O'Connor Street, one block east of Bank Street, but the part east of Bronson was renamed Glebe Avenue on February 7, 1974.

In December 2005 one lane in each direction between Booth Street and Cambridge South just before Bronson was converted to a bus-only lane. This very short (roughly 150 m) bus-only section speeds up bus traffic through the Carling/Bronson intersection during rush-hour.

Carling avenue is roughly 19km long.

Features

Notable features located along Carling Avenue from west to east are Mitel, the Carling Campus, the Communications Research Centre, Smithvale Stables, Andrew Haydon Park, the Lincoln Fields Shopping Centre, Carlingwood Mall, Fairlawn Plaza, Westgate Mall, the Royal Ottawa Mental Health Centre, Ottawa Civic Hospital, Old Dominion Observatory, and Claridge Icon condo tower. It also runs along the northern boundaries of the Central Experimental Farm and Commissioners Park.

Others

Carling is now known as Ottawa Road #38 but used to be Highway 17B east of Richmond Road until the Ontario government downloaded the highway to the local government. Until the 1970s, the western part of Carling was also part of Highway 17.

From 2004 to 2007, Carling Avenue was named one of Ontario's worst 20 roads in a CAA survey, citing frequent bumps and potholes.

One of the first UFO monitoring stations used for Project Magnet was located on Carling Avenue.

OC Transpo service

Dow's Lake station on the O-Train Trillium Line, is located near the intersection of Carling Avenue and Preston Street. OC Transpo bus routes also serve the station.

Major intersections

The addresses change erratically on Carling; they are not consistent from point to point and rise rapidly in the eastern part, then slow down to a very slow rise west of Bayshore.

Major intersections (from west to east, approximate address point):
March Road (4100)
Moodie Drive (3500)
Holly Acres Road, an approach to Highway 417 (3200)
Bayshore Drive (3100)
Pinecrest Road (2800)
Richmond Road (2700)
Sir John A. Macdonald Parkway (2500)
Woodroffe Avenue (2200)
Maitland Avenue (1800)
Queensway/Kirkwood Avenue (1500)
Merivale Road (1300)
Fisher Avenue/Holland Avenue/Island Park Drive/NCC Scenic Driveway (1100)
Parkdale Avenue (1000)
Preston Street (800)
Booth Street (600)
Bronson Avenue (300)

Neighbourhoods
Neighbourhoods along its length are:
 Crystal Beach
 Bayshore
 Michelle Heights
 Britannia
 Pinewood
 Lincoln Heights
 Carlingwood
 Whitehaven
 Carlington
 Hampton Park
 Civic Hospital
 Glebe
 Queensway Terrace North

References

External links

 Google Maps: Carling Avenue

Roads in Ottawa
Former segments of the Trans-Canada Highway